The 1991 Daily Mirror/Sporting Life Greyhound Derby took place during May & June with the final being held on 30 June 1991 at Wimbledon Stadium. The winner Ballinderry Ash received £40,000. The competition was sponsored by the Sporting Life and Daily Mirror.

Final result 
At Wimbledon (over 480 metres):

Distances 
1½, ½, 3, short head, 1 (lengths)
The distances between the greyhounds are in finishing order and shown in lengths. One length is equal to 0.08 of one second.

Competition Report
Scottish Greyhound Derby champion Phantom Flash led the ante-post betting (from 193 entries) going into the 1991 Derby . Other leading contenders included Fires of War and Fearless Mustang and the Irish runners included Laurels winner Concentration, Ballyoughter Lad and Itsallovernow (all Ger McKenna) in addition to the Irish Greyhound Derby champion The Other Toss (Matt O'Donnell). Concentration is subject to a gamble and is backed to 12-1 favourite before the competition starts.

In the qualifying round Ballyoughter Lad went fastest winning in 28.61, Phantom Flash and Concentration both won at odds of 1-6 and 1-10. In the first round Geoff DeMulder's Fearless Mustang recorded 28.39 and Phantom Flash won by 7½ lengths returning at 1-12f. With the field down to 48 for the second round there two shocks when Ballyoughter Lad went out despite being priced at 1-3f and Concentration was eliminated when he turned in the traps. Phantom Flash continued his good ways defeating The Other Toss.

The consistent Dempsey Duke claimed the first quarter-final and remained unbeaten with four straight but this was overshadowed when Phantom Flash found trouble in the same heat and failed to qualify finishing fifth. Summerhill Super won the second quarter at 8-1 with The Other Toss just qualifying in third and Fires of War being eliminated. Fearless Mustang remained unbeaten after winning heat three from Itsallovernow and Ballinderry Ash took the last heat from Slippys Quest.

With Phantom Flash out Fearless Mustang and The Other Toss were the new favourites for the title. Fearless Mustang duly completed a 28.88 victory in the first semi-final with Summerhill Super and Itsallovernow taking the minor places, the unlucky Manorland was a non-runner. The second semi provided a shock when Dunmurry Brandy beat Ballinderry Ash at odds of 20-1 with Dempsey Duke gaining the vital final place. Slippys Quest finished fourth and The Other Toss fifth.

In the final Ballinderry Ash was to provide host track Wimbledon with its second winner since the race moved there in 1985. Fearless Mustang had progressed to the final unbeaten, having posted a fastest-of-the-competition 28.39sec in the second round and was sent off hot favourite. In a competitive race the Helen Roche owned Ballinderry Ash came home first from Itsallovernow in second place.

Quarter finals

Semi finals

See also
1991 UK & Ireland Greyhound Racing Year

References

Greyhound Derby
English Greyhound Derby
English Greyhound Derby